Gunther Scholz (born 9 October 1944) is a German film director and screenwriter. He has directed 25 films since 1979. His 1987 film Interrogating the Witnesses was entered into the 15th Moscow International Film Festival.

Selected filmography
 Interrogating the Witnesses (1987)

References

External links

1944 births
Living people
Mass media people from Saxony
People from Görlitz